Jessica Pratt (born 24 April 1987) is an American musician and singer-songwriter based in Los Angeles, California. Her self-titled debut album was released in 2011 via Birth Records, a record label founded by Darker My Love and White Fence songwriter Tim Presley to release Pratt's music. She is often associated with the freak folk movement.

Early life
Pratt was raised by her mother, who exposed her to a broad range of artists, including Tim Buckley, X, and the Gun Club. She learned to play the guitar around the age of 15, after her older brother gave up playing his Stratocaster. She took his guitar and started practicing with the T. Rex album Electric Warrior. She was soon able to play the guitar parts of the whole record. She eventually began recording songs at the age of 16, using her mother's Fender guitar amp and microphone.

Musical career
After she moved to San Francisco, she was introduced to Tim Presley's solo project, White Fence, through Presley's brother, who was her roommate for three years. In the following years, Presley heard Pratt's demo songs through her then-boyfriend, who had posted her songs on Facebook. He eventually contacted her to release her music.

Pratt's self-titled debut album was released in 2012 through Presley's label, Birth Records. Produced by Craig Gotsill, the album featured the songs that were originally recorded in 2007 over analogue tape. The initial 500 pressings of the album sold out in less than two weeks. It received attention from many music websites and magazines, including Pitchfork, Consequence of Sound and PopMatters.

In January 2014, she revealed the studio version of a new track, "Game That I Play."

In October 2014, Pratt announced her second album, On Your Own Love Again.

In October 2018, she announced her third album, Quiet Signs, and released a video for a new track entitled "This Time Around". Pitchfork reviewed the song, giving it the Best New Music designation and noting a stylistic shift, comparing it to "a Tropicalia version of a Christmas song, or a ’60s jukebox standard playing in a beach town diner during the off-season." The album was released in February 2019 on the Brooklyn independent label Mexican Summer. It was the first one recorded in a proper studio which provided a crystalline sound. The Pitchfork review states the album "warps the typically direct, observational role of a singer-songwriter into something altogether more mystifying".

Musical style

According to Philip Cosores of Consequence of Sound, Pratt's music "displays a lyrical and musical range without straying from a palette of picked acoustic guitar and raw, bending vocals" and nods to "60s folk, California classic rock, and the early 2000s freak folk." She is compared to various folk artists, including Joni Mitchell, Joan Baez, Sibylle Baier, David Crosby and Karen Dalton. She also expressed admiration for Ariel Pink.

Pratt dislikes the Joan Baez comparisons, and is hesitant about being classified strictly as "folk" or "freak-folk." In an interview with Impose magazine, she stated on the freak folk comparisons:

Discography
Studio albums
 Jessica Pratt (2012)
 On Your Own Love Again (2015)
 Quiet Signs (2019)

References

External links
 

Living people
1987 births
Guitarists from San Francisco
American women singer-songwriters
American folk singers
American folk guitarists
Freak folk
Singers from San Francisco
Songwriters from San Francisco
21st-century American women singers
21st-century American women guitarists
21st-century American guitarists
21st-century American singers
Singer-songwriters from California